Camp is a constituency of the Legislative Assembly of the Falkland Islands which has been in existence since 1977. The constituency of Camp consists of all parts of the territory which lie more than 3.5 miles from the spire of Christ Church Cathedral, Stanley. It takes its name from the term "Camp", which refers to the territory outside the city of Stanley and RAF Mount Pleasant. Camp is one of two constituencies in the Falklands, the other being Stanley.

The Camp constituency was created at the 1977 election with the implementation of the Falkland Islands (Legislative Council) (Amendment) Order 1977, initially electing one member to the Legislative Council (the predecessor of the Legislative Assembly). In 1985 the Falkland Islands Constitution came into force which increased the number of members from Camp to four, elected through block voting. This was reduced to three in 1997 following a constitutional amendment. In 2009 a new constitution came into force which replaced the Legislative Council with the Legislative Assembly, with all members of the Legislative Council becoming members of the new Legislative Assembly.

In referendums in 2001, 2011 and 2020, a proposal was put to the people of the Falklands for the Stanley and Camp constituencies to be abolished and replaced with a single constituency for the entire territory. The proposal was rejected on all three occasions.

Members

References 

Constituencies in the Falkland Islands